This was a new event on the 2013 ITF Women's Circuit.

Donna Vekić won the title, defeating Elizaveta Kulichkova in the final, 6–4, 7–6(7–4).

Seeds

Main draw

Finals

Top half

Bottom half

References 
 Main draw

Lale Cup - Singles
Lale Cup